A shrew's fiddle or neck violin is a variation of the yoke, pillory or rigid irons whereby the wrists are locked in front of the bound person by a hinged board or steel bar. It was originally used in the Middle Ages as a way of punishing those who were caught bickering or fighting.

History
It was originally made out of two pieces of wood fitted with a hinge and a lock at the front. The shrew's fiddle consisted of three holes. One was a large hole for the neck and the other two were smaller holes which fastened the wrists in front of the face.

A bell was sometimes attached to this portable pillory, to alert townspeople that the victim was approaching so that they might be mocked and otherwise humiliated. Another version was a "double fiddle" by which two people could be attached together face-to-face, forcing them to talk to each other. They were not released until the argument had been resolved.

See also
 Jougs
 Scold's bridle

References

Physical restraint
Medieval instruments of torture
European instruments of torture